Martin Fischer may refer to:

 Martin Fischer (automobile designer) (1867–1947), designer of Turicum and Fischer brand names
 Martin Fischer (gymnast) (1884–1971), German-born American Olympic gymnast
 Martin Fischer (tennis) (born 1986), Austrian tennis player

See also 
 Martin Fischer-Dieskau (born 1954), German conductor
 Martin Fisher (disambiguation)